Rev. Janusz Bielanski (25 March 1939 – 3 November 2018) was a Roman Catholic priest and was the rector of the Wawel Cathedral in Kraków, Poland from 1983 until 2007. He resigned on January 8, 2007 after repeated allegations about his cooperation with the Służba Bezpieczeństwa—the communist-era secret police. Bielanski's resignation was announced the day after the resignation of Archbishop Stanisław Wielgus from the see of Warsaw.

References

1939 births
2018 deaths
20th-century Polish Roman Catholic priests
21st-century Polish Roman Catholic priests